The Anointed Pace Sisters, commonly known as The Pace Sisters, TAPS is an American gospel vocal group based in Atlanta. Their sister, Tarrian LaShun Pace had a solo career and occasionally performed with the group as a recurring member.

The Anointed Pace Sisters released five albums with two labels during their tenure, and those were 1992's U-Know with Savoy Records, 1995's My Purpose again with Savoy, then 2003's It's Already Done by their own label Gospel Pace, 2006's Return by Tyscot Records, and 2009's Access Granted from Tyscot Records. The group's albums U-Know, My Purpose, Return, and Access Granted charted on the Billboard Gospel Albums chart.

The oldest sister, evangelist Dr. Duranice Pace, one of the group's lead vocalists and a songwriter, died on January 14, 2021.

Background and history
Their parents were Pastor Murphy Pace, Jr. and Mother Bettie Ann Pace and the sisters were all born in Atlanta. The Anointed Pace Sisters began singing together in their father's church and they began their professional singing career in 1988. The nine sisters are: Duranice Ann Pace (May 13, 1958 – January 14, 2021), Phyllis Yvonne Pace (born February 22, 1959), June Lorraine Pace–Martin (born February 13, 1960), LaShun Pace (born September 6, 1961 - March 21, 2022), Melonda Pace (born December 10, 1963), Dejuaii Pace (born April 24, 1965), Leslie Renee Pace (born January 13, 1967), Latrice Pace (born August 28, 1972), and Lydia Lakithia Pace (born April 29, 1974).

The group released five albums from 1992 until 2009, with two being released by Savoy Records. In 1992, they released U-Know and in 1995 they released My Purpose. The third self-released via Gospel Pace, It's Already Done in 2003. The next two were released by Tyscot Records in 2006's Return and 2009's Access Granted. Four albums from the group charted on the Billboard Gospel Albums chart: U-Know at No. 2, My Purpose at No. 17, Return at No. 20, and Access Granted at No. 5. The last album charted on the Independent Albums chart at No. 39.

Members

 Duranice Pace: Soprano (Alto) (born May 13, 1958; died Jan 14, 2021)
 Phyllis Pace: Mezzo-Soprano (Tenor)(63 as 2022)
 June Pace–Martin: Soprano (Alto) (62 as 2022)
 LaShun Pace: Soprano (Alto/Soprano) (born Sept 1961; died March 21, 2022)
 Melonda Pace: Soprano (Soprano)(59 as 2022) 
 Leslie Pace Soprano: (Tenor/Alto/Soprano)(56 as 2022)
 Dejuaii Pace: Mezzo-Soprano (Alto)(53 as 2022)
 Latrice Pace: Soprano (Alto/Soprano)(50 as 2022)
 Lydia Pace: Soprano (Soprano/Alto)(48 as 2022)

Discography

References

External links
 

American gospel musical groups
American gospel singers
Sibling musical groups
African-American musical groups
Musical groups from Atlanta
African-American Christians
American Pentecostals
American girl groups
Musical groups established in 1988
African-American women musicians